Schulmädchen-Report: Was Eltern nicht für möglich halten (Schoolgirl Report Part 1: What Parents Don't Think Is Possible) (UK release title: Confessions of a Sixth Form Girl) is a 1970 West German sex report film directed by Ernst Hofbauer and produced by Wolf C. Hartwig.

Background
The film is a pseudo-documentary loosely based on the non-fictional book Schulmädchen-Report by sexologist Günther Hunold. Published by Kindler Verlag (Munich) the same year, the book presented interviews with twelve teenage girls on their sexual lives.

Reception
The film was a commercial success in 1970, topping the German cinema charts for weeks, becoming the first in a series that would last thirteen titles until 1980.

Musical score
The music by Gert Wilden combined beat lounge and acid rock.

References

Bibliography

External links

1970 films
1970s erotic films
German erotic films
West German films
1970s German-language films
Sexploitation films
Incest in film
German anthology films
Films directed by Ernst Hofbauer
Incest pornography
1970s German films